Doris Jensen may refer to:

 Coleen Gray (Doris Bernice Jensen, 1922–2015), American actress
 Doris J. Jensen (born 1978), Greenlandic politician